The Hauraki Māori are a group of Māori iwi at or around Hauraki Gulf, New Zealand. It includes Ngāti Tara Tokanui, Ngāti Koi, Te Patukirikiri, Ngāti Hako, Ngāti Huarere, Ngāti Hei, Ngāi Tai, Ngāti Pūkenga and Ngāti Rāhiri. It also includes the Marutūāhu people.

References

 
Iwi and hapū